Kam-Fai Wong is a Chinese computer scientist who a professor of engineering at the Chinese University of Hong Kong and a fellow at the Association of Computation Linguistics.

Education 
Wong earned a Bachelor of Science and PhD from the University of Edinburgh.

Career 
Wong worked as a researcher at Unisys, the Erlangen Center for Interface Research and Catalysis, and Heriot-Watt University. Wong is a professor in the department of engineering at the Chinese University of Hong Kong, where he is also the director of the Center of Innovation and Technology. Wong is the also the chief architect of IPOC, a bilingual search engine. He is a co-editor-in-chief of ACM Transactions on Asian Language Information Processing and editor-in-chief of the International Journal of Computer Processing of Languages.

References 

Living people
Chinese computer scientists
Alumni of the University of Edinburgh
Academic staff of the Chinese University of Hong Kong
Year of birth missing (living people)